Yagra is a genus of moths within the family Castniidae.

Species
Yagra dalmannii (Gray, 1838)
Yagra fonscolombe (Godart, [1824])

References

Castniidae